Julianna Grace LeBlanc, known professionally as both Annie LeBlanc and Jules LeBlanc, is an American YouTuber, actress, singer, and former gymnast. In December 2018, Business Insider called her one of the "most famous teens in the world." She appeared on the YouTube channel Bratayley from the age of four and has since gained an extensive online following of her own.

LeBlanc was on the YouTube Red series We Are Savvy before going on to work with the Brat network, starring as Rhyme McAdams in Chicken Girls and its spinoff films and the titular character of A Girl Named Jo. On television, she played Lex in the Nickelodeon buddy comedy series Side Hustle.

Early life 
She has two siblings: a younger sister Hayley, who is also an actress, and an older brother Caleb, who died in 2015 from a heart condition, hypertrophic cardiomyopathy, at the age of 13. LeBlanc started taking gymnastics classes when she was two years old, and her family started posting videos of her online when she was three. She trained as a gymnast until August 2017.

The LeBlancs previously lived in Severna Park, Maryland but then moved to Los Angeles, California so that LeBlanc would be able to start her acting and music careers.

Career 
LeBlanc was originally known for her gymnastic videos. Her gymnastic meets and tutorials started being published in 2008 on her YouTube channel, formerly known as Acroanna, when she was 3 years old. The channel's name was changed in 2017, and now features music videos of Jules LeBlanc.

LeBlanc is one of the stars of a daily vlog on the YouTube channel "Bratayley" (7.3M+ subscribers). The vlog, which was initially just for relatives and started being filmed when LeBlanc was six, follows the lives of the LeBlanc family; no further videos have been posted since November 2019. The stars include parents Billy and Katie with their two daughters Jules and Hayley and son Caleb. The name "Bratayley" was initially a nickname for Hayley, combining the word "brat" and the name "Hayley."

LeBlanc had begun to receive attention for her content on her TikTok handle @julesleblanc. In April 2018, she won the Shorty Award for "Muser of the Year".

LeBlanc and Hayden Summerall collaborated on a YouTube cover of "Little Do You Know" by Alex & Sierra, which went viral. LeBlanc appeared at position 48 on the Emerging Artists Billboard Chart. LeBlanc and Summerall were cast as leads in Chicken Girls despite having no acting experience prior to starring in the series. In August 2017, Brat released the series on YouTube. The series features LeBlanc and Summerall's relationship, and focuses on the daily lives of a group of friends and dancers at the faux high school, "Attaway High". The show's debut episode has received over 10 million YouTube views, and as of May 2018, the second season had between 2 million and 4.5 million views per episode.

On September 9, 2017, LeBlanc's cover of the song "Fly" by Maddie & Tae peaked at 34 on the Billboard Charts in "Country" songs. In November 2017, LeBlanc released her debut original single, "Ordinary Girl." In December 2017, teen fan magazine Tiger Beat announced that LeBlanc would be going on her first U.S. tour in early 2018.  In February 2018, LeBlanc released a single, "Little Things." In early May 2018, LeBlanc released a new pop country compilation album on iTunes called, "Lollipop", with music label Heard Well. The curated collection also includes two songs by LeBlanc, "Somebody's Heart" and "Photograph." She then released  the song "Picture This" in early June with social media star Austin Brown In November 2018, she released her single "It’s Gonna Snow" as a new Christmas Carol.

In August 2017, YouTube greenlit the YouTube Red Originals series, We Are Savvy, as a continuation of a teen magazine series of the same name on Canada's Family Channel. LeBlanc was introduced as a co-host of the series, which debuted with over 4.2M+ views in its pilot episode and focuses on music, fashion, and lifestyle elements.

In February 2018, Variety announced that Lionsgate would be distributing a full-length feature film of Chicken Girls: The Movie. There is also a deal with Skyhorse Publishing to turn the show into a book series. In September 2018, the third season of Chicken Girls premiered on Brat's YouTube channel. Season 4 premiered on March 19, 2019.

In May 2018, LeBlanc and her sister Hayley LeBlanc were cast in a new series on the Brat YouTube channel. That same month, it was announced that LeBlanc and Addison Riecke would star in a Brat teen mystery series called A Girl Named Jo which takes place in 1963 in a small town. Also in May 2018, Leblanc appeared in Asher Angel's music video for "Chemistry" as the fans dubbed them as "Ashannie".

In December 2018 she starred in Brat's feature film, Holiday Spectacular. In March 2019, she also starred in another Brat feature film, Spring Breakaway.

In November 2019, Bratayley stopped making family vlogs after 9 years, for them to focus on other projects.

In February 2020, LeBlanc was cast in a lead role for the Nickelodeon buddy comedy series Side Hustle alongside Jayden Bartels. In response to the COVID-19 pandemic in the United States, Nickelodeon offered LeBlanc and Bartels a virtually-produced talk show titled Group Chat, which premiered on May 23, 2020. Side Hustle ran from November 2020 to June 2022.

In July 2021, LeBlanc became the face of Pacsun's Fall 2021 collection, a campaign focused on reconnecting with yourself, old friends and nature.

Discography

Compilation albums
 Lollipop – Label: Heard Well; Released: May 2018

Singles

Filmography

Tours 
 The Left Me Hangin' Tour (2017)

Awards and nominations

References

External links 
 
 

21st-century American actresses
21st-century American women singers
American TikTokers
American bloggers
American child actresses
American child singers
American women pop singers
American film actresses
American gymnasts
American web series actresses
American women bloggers
American YouTubers
Female gymnasts
Living people
21st-century American singers
YouTube channels launched in 2008
Year of birth missing (living people)